Tarime District is one of the seven districts of the Mara Region of Tanzania, East Africa. It was previously known as the "North Mara District". Its district capital is Tarime town. It is bordered from the north to east by the Kenyan districts of Migori, Trans Mara and Kuria East and West Districts, and to the east by the Maasai Mara game reserve. To the south it is bordered across the Mara River by the Serengeti and Butiama districts, and to the west by Rorya District.

North Mara Gold Mine is located within Tarime District. It is operated by Acacia Mining.

According to the 2002 Tanzania National Census, the population of the Tarime District was 492,798. According to the 2012 Tanzania National Census, the population of Tarime District was 339,693.

Transport
Paved trunk road T4 from Mwanza to the Kenyan border passes through the district. The main border crossing from Tanzania to Kenya in the Lake Victoria zone is located at Sirari, which is also a ward of Tarime District.

Administrative subdivisions
In 2002 Tarime District contained 41 wards, but since the separation off of Rorya District in 2007, Tarime District has been reduced to fewer wards. As of 2012, Tarime District was administratively divided into 30 wards.

Wards

 Binagi
 Bomani
 Bumera
 Genyange
 Gorong'a
 Itiryo
 Kemambo
 Kentare
 Kibasuka
 Kiore
 Komaswa
 Manga
 Matongo
 Mbogi
 Muriba
 Mwema
 Nyakonga
 Gwitiryo
 Nyamisangura
 Nyamwaga
 Nyangoto
 Nyamongo
 Nyansicha
 Nyanungu
 Nyarero
 Nyarokoba
 Nyabichune
 Mjini Kati
 Pemba
 Sabasaba
 Sirari
 Susuni
 Turwa

References

 
Districts of Mara Region